The Leland Corporation was a manufacturer of several arcade video games in the 1980s and early 1990s.  The company was formed when Tradewest purchased the ailing Cinematronics in 1987. Notable among these were Quarterback (1987) and John Elway's Quarterback (1989), Dragon's Lair II: Time Warp (1991), and Ivan 'Ironman' Stewart's Super Off Road, which spawned an expansion and two sequels at Leland's successor company Midway Games (Off Road Challenge and Offroad Thunder). 

John Rowe, (co-founder and President of Tradewest) became the President of the new Leland Corporation and guided the reorganization and technology evolution which led to a number of popular video games which were positioned to transition into the new market of home systems including the NES, Game Boy and Sega Genesis. During the early 1990s, they developed home console titles under the brand name Leland Interactive Media.

Leland was itself purchased in 1994 by WMS Industries. At this point the Leland and Tradewest brands were phased out but much of the staff and all of the facilities continued to be used by WMS and later Midway Games, becoming Midway Games San Diego, which later became THQ San Diego.

John Rowe became the vice-chairman and director of product development for the new company.

External links
 Leland Corporation profile from MobyGames

Video game companies of the United States
Companies based in El Cajon, California